Valentin Stoev (18 July 1952 – 28 January 2018) was a Bulgarian rower. He competed at the 1976 Summer Olympics and the 1980 Summer Olympics.

References

1952 births
2018 deaths
Bulgarian male rowers
Olympic rowers of Bulgaria
Rowers at the 1976 Summer Olympics
Rowers at the 1980 Summer Olympics
Place of birth missing